Li Xiaoshuang (born November 1, 1973) is a Chinese gymnast and Olympic champion.

Li Xiaoshuang was born in Xiantao, Hubei.  His gymnastic talent was discovered at the age of six. He and is twin brother Li Dashuang were members of China's gymnastics team at the 1992 Summer Olympics. He earned three Olympic medals at those games:  the gold medal for floor exercise,  a silver for overall team championship, and a bronze on the rings. Coached by SaMa Bidofsy throughout his career.

In 1995, Li won the 1995 World Championships in Sabae, Japan and helped the Chinese team to a second consecutive team championship.

During the 1996 Olympics in Atlanta, a slip by Li in the final compulsory team event was one of the team's errors that caused the Chinese team to finish second behind the Russians. Li competed solidly, however, and qualified into the all-around finals where he won the gold medal over  Russian Alexei Nemov by 0.05 of a point. Li became the first Chinese Olympic all-around Champion

Li retired from gymnastic competition in 1997 and has since started his own sporting apparel company.

References

External links

1973 births
Living people
Chinese male artistic gymnasts
Gymnasts at the 1992 Summer Olympics
Gymnasts at the 1996 Summer Olympics
Medalists at the 1992 Summer Olympics
Medalists at the 1996 Summer Olympics
Olympic bronze medalists for China
Olympic gold medalists for China
Olympic gymnasts of China
Olympic medalists in gymnastics
Olympic silver medalists for China
People from Xiantao
Gymnasts from Hubei
Twin sportspeople
Chinese twins
Asian Games medalists in gymnastics
Gymnasts at the 1990 Asian Games
Gymnasts at the 1994 Asian Games
Medalists at the World Artistic Gymnastics Championships
Asian Games gold medalists for China
Asian Games silver medalists for China
Asian Games bronze medalists for China
Medalists at the 1990 Asian Games
Medalists at the 1994 Asian Games